Albert Einstein was a German-born theoretical physicist.

Albert Einstein may also refer to:

People
Albert Lawrence Einstein, the birth name of actor, comedian, director, and writer Albert Brooks

Educational institutions
Albert Einstein College of Medicine, an independent degree-granting medical school in New York City
Albert Einstein Institute, also known as the Max Planck Institute for Gravitational Physics, located in Golm, Potsdam, Germany (theoretical branch) and in Hannover, Germany (experimental branch)
Albert Einstein Institution, East Boston, Massachusetts, a non-profit organization dedicated to the study of methods of non-violent resistance
Albert-Einstein-Schule, a former school (grades 5–12) in Bochum, Germany
Albert Einstein International School of San Pedro Sula, Honduras, a private, non-profit, coeducational day school (pre-kindergarten to grade 12)
Albert Einstein International School Amsterdam, The Netherlands (from pre-kindergarten to grade 12), with campuses also in  Lviv, Ukraine and Cambridge, Massachusetts
Albert Einstein High School, Montgomery County, Maryland, grades 9-12
Albert Einstein Academy Charter School, San Diego, California, kindergarten through grade 8
Albert Einstein Middle School, Shoreline School District, Washington state, grades 7-8
Einstein Healthcare Network (formerly Albert Einstein Healthcare Network), a healthcare system in Philadelphia, Pennsylvania, which will be merged with Jefferson Health
Einstein Medical Center Philadelphia (formerly Albert Einstein Medical Center), Philadelphia, Pennsylvania, a tertiary-care teaching hospital, a part of Einstein Healthcare Network

Honors
Albert Einstein Award, with honorees selected by a committee of the Institute for Advanced Study, awarded sporadically from 1951 to 1979 
UNESCO Albert Einstein medal
Albert Einstein Medal, presented by the Albert Einstein Society in Bern, Switzerland, first awarded in 1979
Albert Einstein Peace Prize, awarded by the Chicago-based Albert Einstein Peace Prize Foundation, first presented in 1980
Albert Einstein World Award of Science, given by the World Cultural Council, first awarded in 1984

Arts and entertainment
Albert Einstein (album), a 2013 album by rappers Prodigy and The Alchemist
Albert Einstein: The Practical Bohemian, a 1978 one-man stage play written and performed by actor-writer Ed Metzger
Albert Einstein, a character in the television series Alien Nation
Albert Brooks, born Albert Einstein, an American actor, filmmaker, author, and comedian
 Albert Einstein (Shortened to Albert E.), a Simon Kidgits character developed by Simon Brand Ventures

Other uses
Albert Einstein Hospital, São Paulo, Brazil
Albert Einstein Science Park, Potsdam, Germany
Albert Einstein ATV, a European unmanned cargo resupply spacecraft
Albert Einstein Society, based in Bern, Switzerland
Albert Einstein House, Princeton, New Jersey, Einstein's home from 1936 to his death in 1955
Albert Einstein German Academic Refugee Initiative Fund, sponsored since 1992 by the government of Germany
Albert Einstein: Creator and Rebel, a 1972 biography by Banesh Hoffmann with the collaboration of Helen Dukas
Einstein's Sink, a sink in Leiden University that is famous for the story of Einstein once washing his hands in it